George Hewitt or George Hewett may refer to:

 George Hewitt (1878–?), English footballer for Burslem Port Vale and Luton Town
 Brian George Hewitt (born 1949), English linguist specialising in Caucasian languages
 George Wattson Hewitt (1841–1916), American architect 
 George Hewett (1750–1840), British general and Commander-in-Chief in India and Ireland
 Hewett baronets several descendants also named George
 George Hewett, 1st Viscount Hewett (1652–1689)
 George Hewett (footballer) (born 1995), Australian rules footballer for Carlton

See also
 George Hewitt Cushman (1814–1876), American engraver and miniaturist
 George Hewitt Myers (1875–1957), American forester and philanthropist